Sarah Greene (born 24 July 1984) is an Irish actress and singer. She won acclaim for portraying Helen McCormick in the West End and Broadway productions of The Cripple of Inishmaan.

For her performance in the role, she was nominated for the 2014 Laurence Olivier Award for Best Actress in a Supporting Role, and the 2014 Tony Award for Best Featured Actress in a Play.  She won an Irish Film and Television Award for Best Actress - Drama, as Hecate Poole in the Showtime and Sky series Penny Dreadful, as well as starring as Maxine in the CBS series Ransom.

Early life
Greene was born in Cork, Ireland.

She became interested in acting when she saw Red Riding Hood along with her parents at the Opera House in Cork. A short time later she joined the CADA Performing Arts in Cork, where she took part in theatre plays and musicals until she was 19 years old.
When Greene was six years old she first appeared on stage. She played a twin in the theatre play The King and I at the Opera House in Cork. After leaving CADA Performing Arts she was trained at the Gaiety School of Acting in Dublin, from which she graduated in 2006.

Life and career 

In Greene's first film appearance, in 2008, she played Imelda Egan in Eden. In 2009, she appeared as the barmaid Cathleen in Love and Savagery.

In 2010, she starred as Amber in the play Grimm at The Peacock theatre in Dublin. In 2011, she played Sinead Mulligan in the film The Guard.

In 2013 and 2014, she appeared with Daniel Radcliffe in the theatre play The Cripple of Inishmaan. For her performance as Helen McCormick she was nominated for the Tony Award and the Laurence Olivier Award as best actor in a supporting role. In 2014, she appeared in The Assets. In Noble, she played Christina Noble. In 2014, she appeared as Saxon princess Judith in the television series Vikings. Judith should have become one of the main figures during the third season of the series; however, Greene refused because she wanted to appear on Broadway. In 2015, she played Hecate Poole in Penny Dreadful. In 2019, she began to play one of the leads on Dublin Murders, as Detective Cassie Maddox.

Filmography

Film

Television

Theatre

Video games

Awards and nominations

References

External links
 

Living people
21st-century Irish actresses
Irish television actresses
Irish stage actresses
Irish film actresses
Actresses from Cork (city)
1984 births